Matthew "Matt" Benedict Walker MBE (born 25 April 1978 in Stockport, England) is a British swimmer who has participated in four Paralympic Games, winning eleven medals. He competes in the S7 (butterfly and freestyle), SM7 (medley) and SB7 (breaststroke) classifications.

Career
Walker's first international medal came with a bronze in the 100 m breaststroke at the 1997 European Championships in Spain. Since then he has gone on to win four further European Championship medals and eight World Championship medals. He also won a bronze medal in the 50 m freestyle and finished fourth in the 100 m freestyle, at the 2006 Commonwealth Games in Melbourne, where he was the only disabled swimmer representing England.

Paralympics
Walker competed in the Paralympics for the first time during the 2000 games, in Sydney. In all he took home three medals from these games, a bronze in the 100 m breaststroke SB7, silver in the 50 m freestyle S7 and gold in the 4×100 m freestyle 34 pts. As part of the gold medal winning relay team, which also included Jody Cundy, Giles Long and David Roberts, he set a new world record time of 4:06.85.

In the 2004 Summer Paralympics, in Athens, Walker won a further two individual medals, silvers in both the 50 and 100 m S7 freestyle events. He was again part of the gold medal winning 4×100 m freestyle 34 pts relay team, which also included Roberts, Graham Edmunds and Robert Welbourn, that set a new world record of 3:59.62.

Beijing 2008 was Walker's third appearance at a Paralympics, and his most successful to date with five medals won. He medalled in both the 50 and 100 m S7 freestyle events, as he had done in Athens, and picked up medals in butterfly and medley events for the first time, winning silver in the 50 m S7 butterfly, with a European record time of 32.24 seconds, and bronze in the 200 m individual medley SM7. Competing alongside David Roberts, Robert Welbourn and Graham Edmunds, Walker won a gold medal in the 4×100 m freestyle 34 pts for the third time in as many Games. This meant that he has now won eleven Paralympic medals, with all of his silver and bronze medals being won individually and all three of his golds being in relay events.

Walker was appointed Member of the Order of the British Empire (MBE) in the 2009 New Year Honours for services to disabled sport.

In the 2012 Paralympics, within the S7 category, Walker participated in the 50m freestyle, 100m freestyle, 50m butterfly, winning bronze in the former category.

See also
List of IPC world records in swimming
Swimming at the 2000 Summer Paralympics
Swimming at the 2004 Summer Paralympics
Swimming at the 2008 Summer Paralympics
Swimming at the 2012 Summer Paralympics

References

External links
 
 
 
 

1978 births
Living people
English male swimmers
Paralympic swimmers of Great Britain
Paralympic gold medalists for Great Britain
Paralympic silver medalists for Great Britain
Paralympic bronze medalists for Great Britain
Paralympic medalists in swimming
Swimmers at the 2000 Summer Paralympics
Swimmers at the 2004 Summer Paralympics
Swimmers at the 2008 Summer Paralympics
Swimmers at the 2012 Summer Paralympics
Medalists at the 2000 Summer Paralympics
Medalists at the 2004 Summer Paralympics
Medalists at the 2008 Summer Paralympics
Medalists at the 2012 Summer Paralympics
Commonwealth Games bronze medallists for England
Commonwealth Games medallists in swimming
Swimmers at the 2006 Commonwealth Games
Medalists at the World Para Swimming Championships
Medalists at the World Para Swimming European Championships
Members of the Order of the British Empire
World record holders in paralympic swimming
S7-classified Paralympic swimmers
Team Bath swimmers
Team Bath Paralympic athletes
British male freestyle swimmers
British male medley swimmers
British male butterfly swimmers
Medallists at the 2006 Commonwealth Games